Tunisia participated at the 2018 Summer Youth Olympics in Buenos Aires, Argentina from 6 October to 18 October 2018.

Athletics

Tunisia qualified four athletes.

Qualification Legend: Q=Final A (medal); qB=Final B (non-medal); qC=Final C (non-medal); qD=Final D (non-medal); qE=Final E (non-medal)

Boys
Track & road events

Girls
Field Events

Boxing

Tunisia qualified one boxer based on its performance at the 2018 AIBA Youth African Championships

Girls

Canoeing

Tunisia has qualified one boat for the following distances into the Olympic canoeing regatta through the 2018 youth olympic games canoeing world qualification event.

Boys

Gymnastics

Rhythmic Gymnastics

Tunisia qualified one athlete based on its performance at the 2018 youth African Rhythmic gymnastics and trampoline Championships.

Individual

Mixed multi-discipline team

Team

Judo

Tunisia qualified two athletes based on its performance at the 2017 Cadet World Judo Championships.
Individual

Team

Rowing

Rugby sevens

Girls' tournament

Roster

 Chaima Arbi
 Sabrine Barhoumi
 Amna Ben Arous
 Halima Ben Charrada
 Abir Dhahri
 Nesrine Faidi
 Jihen Fatnassi
 Khouloud Hammami
 Maissa Haouani
 Lamia Mlawah
 Hajer Saoudi
 Amna Zarrai

Group stage

Sailing

Tunisia qualified one boat based on its performance at the African Nacra 15 Qualifiers.

Mixed

Shooting

Tunisia qualified one sport shooter based on its performance at the 2017 African Championships.

Women

Mixed

Swimming

Tunisia qualified four swimmers.

Boys

Table tennis

Tunisia qualified one table tennis player based on its performance at the African Continental Qualifier.

Singles

Taekwondo

Triathlon

Tunisia qualified two athlete based on its performance at the 2018 African Cadet and junior Championships.

Individual

Relay

Weightlifting

Tunisia qualified one athlete based on its performance at the 2018 African Cadet Championships

Girls

Wrestling

Tunisia qualified three athletes based on its performance at the 2018 African Cadet Championships.

Boys

Girls

References

2018 in Tunisian sport
Nations at the 2018 Summer Youth Olympics
Tunisia at the Youth Olympics